Laramie is an American Western television series that aired on NBC from 1959 to 1963. A Revue Studios production, the program originally starred John Smith as Slim Sherman, owner of the Sherman Ranch, along with his younger brother Andy, played by Robert L. Crawford, Jr.; Robert Fuller as Jess Harper, an immature, hot-headed drifter who shows up at the Sherman Ranch in the premiere episode; and Hoagy Carmichael as Jonesy, who keeps the homestead/stage stop running while Slim and Jess usually alternate starring roles during the show. Actress Spring Byington was later added to the cast. STARZ!'s Westerns Channel and the Grit network began airing the series in July 2015.

Synopsis
The two Sherman brothers and a drifter, Jess Harper, come together to run a stagecoach stop for the Great Central Overland Mail Company after the Shermans' father, Matt, was murdered by a greedy land seeker. The Sherman parents are buried on the ranch.  Near the end of the series, Matt Sherman was revealed to have been falsely accused during the American Civil War of having aided the Confederates. After Jess Harper finds on Sherman Ranch land the wreckage of a Union Army gold wagon stolen by Confederate raiders, Slim sets forth with the officer accused of helping the Confederates, portrayed by Frank Overton, and an Army major, the real culprit played by John Hoyt, to clear Matt Sherman's name. The gold dust in question had long ago been scattered by the wind.

The series premiere "Stage Stop" (September 15, 1959), which was filmed in color, explains how Slim Sherman and Jess Harper become partners in the Sherman Ranch and Relay Station. Jess arrives in Wyoming from Texas in search of an erstwhile "friend", Pete Morgan, played by John Mitchum, who had robbed Jess. Morgan is part of the gang of Bud Carlin (Dan Duryea). The gang captures Judge Thomas J. Wilkens (Everett Sloane), to keep him from trying Morgan. Though Jess and Slim are at odds with each other in their first encounters, and friendship seems out of the question, Andy Sherman takes an instant liking to Jess. Andy even asks Jess to take him away from the ranch, where he lives with his older brother Slim. Their first housekeeper is Jonesy, the role filled by Carmichael. Slim and Jess must fight together when Carlin shows up at the relay station (Carlin says he likes to watch men fight), and proceeds to humiliate the judge.

In "The General Must Die" (November 17, 1959), Brian Keith appears as Whit Malone, an old friend of Slim Sherman's from the Union Army. Malone and a mentally troubled Colonel Brandon, played by John Hoyt in another appearance on the series, arrive at the relay station with a daring but foiled plan to assassinate General William Tecumseh Sherman, who is scheduled to pass through the station on a stagecoach. Gilman Rankin makes a cameo appearance as General Sherman. This episode reveals that Slim Sherman entered the Army as a private and advanced to second lieutenant and fought under General Sherman (no relation) in the March to the Sea in Georgia.

Subsequent episodes focus on the close friendship that develops between Slim and Jess, as they become like brothers with occasionally strong differences of opinion, but always finding reconciliation and common ground. Generally, Slim, who is taller than Jess and two years older, is depicted as the more level-headed and thoughtful, with Jess as more emotional, with righteous indignation and difficulty controlling his temper.

In the episode "Cactus Lady" (February 21, 1961), it is revealed that Jess Harper had been nearly hanged by mistake in the border city of Laredo, Texas, because of the McCanles gang, played by Arthur Hunnicutt, L. Q. Jones, Harry Dean Stanton, and Anita Sands. The gang arrives suddenly in Laramie.
 
The German title of Laramie is Am Fuß der blauen Berge (At the Foot of the Blue Mountains), despite them being located some 600 miles north-west from Laramie, Wyoming.

Cast

 John Smith as Slim Sherman
 Robert Fuller as Jess Harper
 Robert L. Crawford, Jr. as Andy Sherman (1959–1960)
 Hoagy Carmichael as Jonesy (1959–1960)
 Spring Byington as Daisy Cooper (1961–1963)
 Dennis Holmes as Mike Williams (1961–1963)
 Stuart Randall as Sheriff Mort Cory (1961–1963)
 Eddy Waller as Mose Shell, a stagecoach driver in 19 episodes between 1959 and 1962

Background and production 
Hoagy Carmichael's contract was not renewed after the first season, and his character was eliminated with the explanation that he had accompanied Andy to boarding school in St. Louis. Andy, however, returned to appear in three episodes in the first half of the second season.

To restore the chemistry of the original cast, as the third season began in 1961, Spring Byington, formerly of the sitcom December Bride, and Dennis Holmes joined the series in the roles of Daisy Cooper, a matronly widow, and Mike Williams, a young orphan permitted to live at the Sherman Ranch pending location of any next of kin, which never happened. At the beginning of its third season, Laramie was one of the first television programs that made the transition from black-and-white to color.

Because of declining ratings in its last season, Laramie was cancelled.

The Laramie Peacock 
The NBC peacock logo, in use since 1956, was given an update on January 2, 1962, when a new version of the NBC peacock "living color" logo was introduced before the Laramie broadcast that evening. The "Laramie Peacock" featured the bird fanning its plumage against a kaleidoscopic color background (with the eleven melded feathers shrinking and separating into the peacock's form); it used the same "living color" spiel as with the first peacock but the music piece that accompanied it was a soft, woodwind-based number. This symbol was used before every color program on the network until it was retired in 1975, but the Laramie version has made special appearances throughout the ensuing years, mostly in a retro-kitsch context or to commemorate a significant broadcast event on NBC.

Episodes

Season 1 (1959–60)

Season 2 (1960–61)

Season 3 (1961–62)

Season 4 (1962–63)

Selected episodes

In "Dark Verdict" (November 24, 1959), L. Q. Jones portrays John MacLane, who is falsely accused of murdering a doctor. MacLane, who is a friend of Jess Harper's, is apprehended by a lynch mob led by James Hedrick (Warren Stevens). Hedrick is the son of eccentric Judge Matthew Hedrick, portrayed by Thomas Mitchell, who stacks the trial against MacLane, who is quickly convicted and hanged. Judge Hedrick then serves as defense attorney for the lynch mob in a collective trial before the circuit judge. The mob is released on grounds that the homicide was without criminal intent, leniency is recommended by the jury, and the suspects must be retried under individual indictments, a technicality that outrages Jess Harper. Slim Sherman, who had tried to defend MacLane at the trial, cautions Jess against precipitous action, and the two come to temporary blows. Jess and Slim find that Hedrick, grieved by his own corruption, has committed suicide. Walter Coy plays the prosecutor, and Harry Dean Stanton portrays Vern Cowan, the doctor's real killer.

On December 1, 1959, James Gregory appeared as Father Elliott in the episode "Man of God." The priest hires Charlie Root, played by Bill Williams, to guide him to meet with the Sioux Chief Sitting Bull to foster a peace treaty on the lawless Wyoming frontier of the early 1870s. Series character Jess Harper fears for Father Elliott's safety when he learns that Charlie Root is wanted for murder and sets forth in pursuit of both men. Douglas Kennedy appears in this episode as a gunrunner and Tyler MacDuff as an Army lieutenant.
 
Claude Akins appeared four times on Laramie, including the role of former Sheriff Jim Dark in the episode "Queen of Diamonds" (September 20, 1960), with Julie London, who was cast in 1972 with Robert Fuller and her husband, Bobby Troup, on NBC's Emergency! London plays Dark's estranged wife, a card dealer using the name "June Brown." Dark foiled a robbery by the Reeves brothers, one of whom was killed, but his right hand was severely injured, and he can no longer handle a gun. June avoids her husband for his own protection when the outlaw brothers pursue them. Clem Reeves is portrayed by Tony Young, later cast as "Cord" in the short-lived Gunslinger series on CBS. Ultimately, the gang is captured, and the Darks are reconciled and leave Laramie by stagecoach. This episode has comic scenes of Slim Sherman and Jess Harper with repeated household chores since Slim's brother, Andy, had left the ranch for boarding school.

In "Three Rode West" (October 4, 1960), Vera Miles appears as Annie Andrews, a woman seeking a husband. When the outlaw Frank Skinner, played by Myron Healey, admits that he will not marry her, Annie set her sights on Slim Sherman, who is not interested in marriage either but is looking for Skinner, for whom he had earlier ridden shotgun on the stagecoach. Skinner then robbed the stage of its $10,000 shipment and shot to death Jack Adams, played by Ross Elliott, the manager of the stage line in Rockland City. Slim had never met Adams, who had been a friend of his late father, Matt Sherman. Skinner tries to use Annie to lure Sherman into an ambush. The episode also features Chris Alcaide and Denver Pyle.
 
In "Ride the Wild Wind" (October 11, 1960), Ernest Borgnine guest stars as Boone Caudie, a "compassionate" outlaw who is courting a kind widow, Hannah Moore, played by Vivi Janiss (the second of the five wives of Bob Cummings), whom he plans to marry after one more bank holdup, this time in Casper. The outlaws find Andy Sherman on the trail riding a wild horse which they had stolen a year earlier from the Sherman ranch. The horse had just been returned after its rider, a member of the Caudie gang, was shot to death following a bank robbery in Laramie. Slim Sherman tracks down the gang in search of his brother. He finds a painting of U.S. President Ulysses S. Grant on Hannah's mantle. The painting was stolen by Caudie in the Laramie bank robbery and presented as a surprise "gift" to Hannah. The outlaws, including Caudie, are all killed in the foiled bank robbery in Casper. Borgnine had previously guest starred in the episode "Circle of Fire" originally airing on September 29, 1959.

In "The Long Riders" (October 25, 1960), Slim Sherman and Jess Harper, while rounding up mustangs for extra money, save from an Indian attack the life of Luke Gregg (Dan Duryea). Slim invites Luke to work temporarily at the ranch, but Jess believes something is awry when Luke mentions Slim's past association with a vigilante group in Adobe Wells, Kansas. Luke is tied to Ed McKeever (John Anderson), a gunman who has been targeting the former vigilantes one by one. McKeever and his gang try to ambush Slim, who comes to the aid of Sheriff Mort Corey, another former Adobe Wells vigilante shot and wounded by McKeever. Ultimately, McKeever shoots Luke to death as Luke warns Slim of danger.
 
In "License to Kill" (November 22, 1960), R. G. Armstrong plays Sam Jarrad, a former bounty hunter and a sheriff in Colorado, who comes to Laramie with a warrant for Jess Harper, who is accused of murdering a powerful rancher named Blake Wilkie. Slim Sherman is deputized to accompany Jarrad and Jess to Colorado. Denny Miller, later cast on Wagon Train as a regular, Duke Shannon, along with Robert Fuller as Cooper Smith, appears in this episode as Wilkie's son who has framed Jess for Blake Wilkie's death.

In "Drifter's Gold" (November 29, 1960), Rod Cameron, who appeared six times on Laramie, plays Tom Bedloe, an outlaw who has started the rumor of a nearby gold strike. When Slim Sherman comes to Laramie to buy supplies, he finds the town nearly deserted and must pretend to be an outlaw to survive. Meanwhile, Bedloe is looking for Marcie Benson, the daughter he has never seen, played by Judi Meredith. Gregory Walcott plays Duke, Bedloe's partner in crime.

In "Duel at Parkison Town" (December 13, 1960), Henry Hull guest starred as Ben Parkison, an embittered rancher who challenges Slim Sherman to a duel after Parkison's younger son accidentally kills himself on Sherman ranch land while stealing a calf. Ron Harper portrays the other Parkison son, Tom. The episode reveals that the Parksions and Shermans had many past disagreements that had resulted in a feud, but Slim had thought that the two families, now reduced in number, could live in peace.

In "Stolen Tribute" (January 31, 1961), Jess Harper is forced at gunpoint to journey into the Utah Territory by a released prisoner, Clint Wade, played by Jan Merlin, in search of $80,000 in stolen gold coins. Jess had killed and buried Wade's brother five years earlier at an abandoned Spanish mission in the desert but without finding the whereabouts of the buried gold. Soon Wade's former cellmate, Deke Beldon, played by Dennis Patrick, joins them with plans to take the money for himself. At the outpost, the three come upon crusty recluse Tully Casper, played by Edgar Buchanan, who also has his eyes on the gold. Ultimately, Jess forces Casper to turn over the gold to authorities after Casper has spent some $200 in a saloon.

In "The Lost Dutchman" (February 14, 1961), Slim Sherman and Jess Harper arrive in Jackson City to purchase cattle from a state senator, George Lake, played by Robert Emhardt. Lake, however, reneges on the deal and is then murdered. Circumstantial evidence points to Slim as the culprit. When Jess sets forth to clear his friend, he comes across several persons seeking to find a cavalry spur that supposedly contains a map to the fabled Lost Dutchman's Gold Mine in Arizona. Lake was killed for the map, and Jess races to find the decisive spur before Slim can be tried, convicted, and hanged. Karen Steele appears as Linda Lake.

In "Killer Odds" (April 25, 1961), Jess Harper comes upon Fred Powers, a stranger with a price on his head, played by John Lupton, formerly of the Broken Arrow series. Slim Sherman offers Fred employment on the ranch though Fred is pursued by bounty hunters portrayed by Lee Van Cleef and Russell Johnson. The charge against Fred is fraudulent because he had killed in self-defense. Fred begins to court Sue Fenton, played by Patricia Michon, in whom Slim also has a romantic interest. Ultimately, Slim, Jess, and Fred must rescue Sue and her family from the gunslingers. As the episode ends, Fred, not Slim, gets the girl, and the two head by covered wagon to California, where Sue had inherited unseen property.

"The Mountain Men" (October 17, 1961) is not set in the wilderness as the title implies but at the Sherman Relay Station, from which Ben Sanford, played by Dan Duryea, and one of the original settlers in the Laramie area, and his two sons intend to remove a prisoner, Joe Vance, who is being transported to Fort Leavenworth after conviction of the manslaughter of a third Sanford son. The Sanfords plan to lynch the prisoner to get the justice that they believe the court denied them. At the time the Sanfords arrive at the relay station, Slim Sherman and Jess Harper are painting the roof, and Daisy Cooper and Mike Williams have gone into town for supplies. Ultimately, the younger of the Sanford sons, John, played in his acting debut by Alex Cord, a long-time friend of Robert Fuller's, fires a warning shot to alert the stagecoach carrying Vance. The older belligerent son, portrayed by Jason Evers, falls in a gunfight with Jess, but Vance proceeds to serve his sentence at Leavenworth.

In "The Fatal Step" (October 24, 1961), Gary Clarke appeared as Tad Kimball, a young friend of Jess Harper. Kimball, however, joins a partner, portrayed by Dennis Patrick, in the sabotage and robbery of a stage in which Jess is riding shotgun. He regrets taking part in the crime and tries belatedly to make amends.
 
In "Deadly Is the Night" (November 7, 1961), Jess Harper stops at the former stagecoach outpost of Ma Tolliver (Olive Carey) to rest his lame horse. Suddenly Matt Dyer, an outlaw played by Lloyd Nolan, arrives with his gang and takes as hostage Jess, Ma, and her granddaughter, Sue (Marlene Willis).  Dyer proceeds to humiliate the hostages, and when a posse arrives, he tries to use Ma and Sue to prevent the storming of the house. However, the posse forces his hand, and the outlaws flee, but Jess prevents Dyer from running away. Harry Lauter appears as Rafe Andrews.

In "The Accusers" (November 14, 1961), housekeeper Daisy Cooper identifies Slim Sherman's stage line boss, Allen Winter, played by Charles Drake, as having left a hotel room right after a saloon girl, Carla Morton, portrayed by Joanne Linville, is murdered there. At first, few believe Daisy because Winter is a respected man in Laramie. Carla had pressured Winter to leave his wife and marry her. When Daisy searches for further proof of Winter's guilt, Winter resorts to sabotage of Daisy's carriage and stakes out the Sherman ranch house, posing as an Indian, while Slim is away on an overnight assignment authorized by Winter. Slim suddenly becomes convinced of Daisy's story and rides to her rescue.

The episode "Handful of Fire" (December 5, 1961) is loosely based on historical events. A Colonel John Barrington, played by George Macready, and presumably modeled on John Chivington of the Sand Creek massacre in Colorado in 1864, escapes while facing a court martial at Fort Laramie for his role in the later Wounded Knee Massacre of 1890 in South Dakota. The episode reveals that Slim Sherman was present at Wounded Knee and hence testified against Barrington, but that time sequence is inconsistent with the other episodes of Laramie, set in the 1870s. Barrington's daughter, Madge takes Slim hostage. She has documents in her possession which she contends justify Barrington's harsh Indian policies. Slim escapes but must negotiate with the Sioux to avoid massacre.

Later episodes
In "The Confederate Express" (January 30, 1962), the outlaw Matt Grundy, played by John Larch, arrives in Laramie with a scheme to win back the affection of his wife, Martha, portrayed by Peggy Webber, and their young daughter, Tina. As a favor to their neighbor, Martha, Slim Sherman and Jess Harper defend Grundy, who is pursued by the Kerrigan brothers, played by Harry Dean Stanton, Steve Brodie, and James Beck. Grundy fools Slim and Jess into thinking that he must reach Laramie to deposit a bank draft, but he really intends to rob the bank. Grundy had saved Jess from an accident while he was repairing the wheel of a stagecoach but then injects him with a dangerous chemical to keep him from talking after Jess learns that Grundy is indeed an outlaw. Grundy shoots Slim in the arm. As he died, Grundy asked Slim to make sure that Martha received the reward money on his head.

In "The Fortune Hunter" (October 9, 1962), Ray Danton plays Vince Jackson, a suave but nefarious suitor for a young woman, Kitty McAllen, played by Carolyn Craig, whom he plans to marry in order to extort money from her wealthy father, Fred McAllen, portrayed by Parley Baer. However, Slim Sherman has his own interest in Kitty who is using Vince's alleged affections to make Slim jealous. Ultimately, Kitty leaves Laramie to attend college.

In "Gun Duel" (December 25, 1962), Jess Harper is the weekend deputy while Sheriff Mort Corey is away on business. Mort's newly married nephew, Johnny Hartley, played by Ben Cooper, wants to become a deputy too but finds he is unsuited for the work only after nearly getting killed by gunshot from two bank robbers, played by DeForest Kelley and Richard Devon. Carole Wells, formerly of National Velvet, portrays Carol Hartley, Johnny's wife. Jack Elam appears in this episode as the comical Pastor Hawks, dressed in black, who is an unconventional jail "guest".  Gail Kobe, formerly of CBS's Trackdown, plays Lottie Harris, a saloon girl who had hoped to marry one of the bank robbers and then head to California. Jess advises Lottie to stop gazing out the window at the dusty Laramie street and to look instead in the mirror to overcome her own weaknesses.

In "No Place to Run" (February 5, 1963), Don Durant played the role of Gandy Ross, a likeable safecracker trying to go straight. Ellen Burstyn plays Ross's girlfriend, Amy, and Arch Johnson is cast as the outlaw Sam Wellman, who forces Ross to open the safe in the bank at fictitious Granite City. Tom Skerritt plays the role of Price. Jess Harper does his best to rescue his friend Ross from the clutches of the outlaws.

In "Broken Honor" (April 9, 1963), Rod Cameron and Peggy McCay portray Roy and Martha Halloran, a farm couple who stumbles upon $30,000 in money found inside a strong box on their property. The loot had been seized in a stagecoach heist and hidden away for later retrieval. Roy, who is reliant on a wheelchair, insists on keeping the money until Jess Harper arrives amid grave danger to all of their lives from the bandits searching about for the missing money. One of the bandits is played by Don "Red" Barry, best remembered from the 1940 film Adventures of Red Ryder.

In "Trapped" (May 14, 1963), guest stars include Tommy Sands, Claude Akins, and Jim Davis. In the story line, Slim Sherman finds an injured kidnap victim in the woods, portrayed by Mona Freeman. Dennis Holmes, as Mike Williams, rides away to seek help, but the kidnappers reclaim the hostage. Slim pursues the kidnappers but is mistaken as a third kidnapper by the girl's father, played by Barton MacLane. Sands plays the girl's boyfriend, who had been ordered by her father to cease seeing her.
 
In "The Road to Helena" (series finale, May 21, 1963), Slim Sherman, while in Cody, Wyoming, is hired by David Franklin, played by Henry Hull, and his barmaid daughter, Ruth, portrayed by Maggie Pierce, to guide the pair to Helena, Montana, so that Franklin can return money that he had previously stolen. John M. Pickard, who appeared seven times on Laramie, guest stars in the final episode as Bradford.

Other guest stars

 Anna-Lisa
 Rico Alaniz
 Eddie Albert
 Chris Alcaide
 Phyllis Avery
 Joanna Barnes
 Bruce Bennett
 James Best
 Lyle Bettger
 Ernest Borgnine
 Robert Bray
 Charles Bronson
 James Brown
 Kathie Browne
 Edgar Buchanan
 Jean Byron
 Rod Cameron
 Spencer Chan
 James Coburn
 Fred Coby
 Pat Conway
 Russ Conway
 Christopher Dark
 Jim Davis (actor)
 Frank De Kova
 Dan Duryea
 Robert Emhardt
 Jena Engstrom
 Nanette Fabray
 Paul Fix
 Michael Forest
 Ron Foster
 Dean Fredericks
 Tom Greenway
 Robert Griffin
 Clu Gulager
 Kevin Hagen
 Alan Hale, Jr.
 Margaret Hamilton
 Stacy Harris
 Ron Hayes
 Ben Johnson
 Brian Keith
 DeForest Kelley
 Brett King
 Robert Knapp
 John Larch
 Nolan Leary
 Dayton Lummis
 Herbert Lytton
 Barton MacLane
 Jock Mahoney
 Ken Mayer
 John McIntire
 David McLean
 Stephen McNally
 Jan Merlin
 Read Morgan
 Ed Nelson
 Leonard Nimoy
 Lloyd Nolan
 Warren Oates
 Gregg Palmer
 James Parnell
 Judson Pratt
 Denver Pyle
 Herbert Rudley
 Bing Russell
 Jacqueline Scott
 George Selk
 Richard Shannon
 Olan Soule
 Fay Spain
 Olive Sturgess
 Karl Swenson
 Gloria Talbott
 Kent Taylor
 Kelly Thordsen
 Gary Vinson
 Gregory Walcott
 Dawn Wells
 Adam West
 Robert J. Wilke
 Will Wright
 Gene Roth
 Dennis Patrick
 William Bryant
 House Peters Jr.
 Ed Prentiss
 Hugh Sanders
 John Pickard
 Reginald Gardiner
 Lew Ayres
 Russell Johnson
 Karen Steele
 Robert Armstrong
 George Keymas
 Rayford Barnes
 Francis McDonald
 John Dehner
 L Q Jones
 Percy Helton
 Vera Miles
 Myron Healey
 Ross Elliott
 Chris Alcaide
 Tom London
 Phyllis Love
 Russ Bender
 John Anderson
 Cloris Leachman
 Fay Spain
 Roy Barcroft
 R.G. Armstrong
 Denny Miller
 William Fawcett
 Don Beddoe
 Arthur Hunnicutt

Home media
Timeless Media Group has released all four seasons on DVD in Region 1.

References

External links

 
 Detailed fansite 

1950s Western (genre) television series
1959 American television series debuts
1960s Western (genre) television series
1963 American television series endings
Black-and-white American television shows
NBC original programming
Television series by Universal Television
Television shows set in Wyoming